Arrowhead Regional Medical Center (ARMC) is a teaching hospital located in Colton, California, within Southern California's Inland Empire. ARMC is owned and operated by the County of San Bernardino. The emergency department (ED) at ARMC is the second busiest ED in the state of California. The hospital operates ten different residency training programs.

In the most recent year with available data, the hospital had 24,441 admissions, performed 6,483 inpatient and 5,367 outpatient surgeries, and 254,000 outpatient visits.  Arrowhead Regional Medical Center is accredited by the American Osteopathic Association's Healthcare Facilities Accreditation Program, the Centers for Medicare and Medicaid Services, and is certified by the American College of Surgeons as a Level II trauma center.

Services
ARMC is a comprehensive stroke center, and was the first primary stroke center in San Bernardino County. The emergency department (ED) at ARMC has more than 130,461 visits annually, making it the second busiest ED in the state of California. The hospital provides the only burn center for San Bernardino, Riverside, Inyo, and Mono counties. Image Guided Intensity Modulated Radiation Therapy is offered as part of the Medical Imaging Department.
 General Medical and Surgical Care
 Medical, Surgical, and Burn Intensive Care
 Cardiology
 Emergency Department
 Family Medicine/Satellite Clinics
 General Radiology
 Interventional Radiology
 Neonatal Intensive Care Unit
 Neurology
 Obstetrics
 Orthopedics
 Pediatric Medical and Surgical care
 Psychiatry
 Trauma Center

Facility

ARMC is a 456-bed county hospital.  90 of the total 456 hospital beds are behavioral health and 366 are hospital inpatient beds. The hospital building is located nine miles from the San Andreas and two miles from the San Jacinto active fault lines, the new center is designed to remain self-sufficient for a minimum of three days after an 8.3 magnitude earthquake. The facility uses a combination of elastomeric base isolators and hydraulic viscous dampers (similar to those used in an MX missile silo) to absorb the energy generated during a seismic event and to protect the building's structural integrity.

The emergency department is a level II trauma center and consists of 15 observation rooms, 8 treatment rooms, 8 trauma rooms, and 3 law enforcement rooms.  The hospital has a helicopter landing area, which is equipped to accommodate medivac and military helicopters.  There is an outpatient building on the ARMC campus, which houses 109 examination rooms and 8 procedure rooms.

The Arrowhead Regional Medical Center is the first facility in the U.S. to use filmless radiology hospital-wide. This system makes digital images, which are instantly available for viewing at multiple stations throughout the facility for faster and more accurate diagnosis.

Graduate medical education
ARMC operates six ACGME accredited residency programs that train newly graduated physicians in specialties such as family medicine, emergency medicine, surgery, obstetrics and gynecology, internal medicine, and psychiatry. Additionally there are four ACGME accredited fellowships in Emergency Medical Services,  
Maternal-Fetal Medicine, Pulmonary Critical Care Medicine and Surgical Critical Care. 

ARMC is the primary teaching hospital for the California University of Science and Medicine, School of Medicine, located adjacent to the hospital grounds.

References

External links
 Arrowhead Regional Medical Center official website
 This hospital in the CA Healthcare Atlas A project by OSHPD

Hospitals in San Bernardino County, California
Colton, California
County hospitals in California
Teaching hospitals in California
Hospital buildings completed in 1999
Organizations based in San Bernardino County, California
Hospitals established in 1999
1999 establishments in California
Trauma centers